The Merina people (also known as the Imerina, Antimerina, or Hova) are the largest ethnic group in Madagascar. They are the "highlander" Malagasy ethnic group of the African island and one of the country's eighteen official ethnic groups. Their origins are mixed, predominantly with Austronesians arriving before the 5th century AD, then many centuries later with Arabs, Africans and other ethnic groups. They speak the Merina dialect of the official Malagasy language of Madagascar.

The Merina people are most commonly found in the center of the island (former Antananarivo Province). Beginning in the late 18th century, Merina sovereigns expanded the political region under their control from their interior capital, outwards into the island, with their king Radama I ultimately helping unite the island under their rule. The French fought two wars with the Merina people in 1883–1885 and in 1895, colonized Madagascar in 1895–96 and abolished the Merina monarchy in 1897.

They built innovative and elaborate irrigation infrastructure and highly productive rice farms in high plateaus of Madagascar by the 18th century. The Merina people were socially stratified with hierarchical castes, inherited occupations and endogamy, and one or two of the major and long serving monarchs of the Merina people were queens.

History

Austronesian people started settling in Madagascar between 200 and 500 CE. They arrived by boats and were from various southeast Asian and Oceanian groups. Later Swahili-Arabs and Indian traders came to the island's northern regions. African slaves were brought to the island's coasts between the 13th and the 18th centuries. The Portuguese traders were the first Europeans to arrive in the 15th century, followed by other European powers.

This influx of diverse people led to various Malagasy sub-ethnicities in the mid-2nd millennium. The Merina were probably the early arrivals, though this is uncertain and other ethnic groups on Madagascar consider them relative newcomers to the island. The Merina people's culture likely mixed and merged with the Madagascar natives named Vazimba about whom little is known. According to the island's oral traditions, the "most Austronesian looking" Merina people reached the interior of the island in the 15th century and established their society there because of wars and migrant pressure at the coast. Merina people were settled in the central Madagascar, formed one of the three major kingdoms on the island by the 18th century – the other two being Sakalava kingdom on the west-northwest and Betsimisaraka kingdom on the east-northeast.

These early Merina settlers through their industriousness and innovative abilities built vast irrigation projects that helped drain the plateau marshes, irrigate arable lands, and grow rice two times every year. They emerged as the politically dominant group and a wealthy kingdom towards the close of the 18th century. The capital of their kingdom remains the capital of contemporary Madagascar.

Oral history traces the emergence of a united kingdom in the central highlands of Madagascar – a region called Imerina – back to early 16th-century king Andriamanelo. By 1824, a succession of Merina kings had conquered nearly all of Madagascar, particularly through the military strategy, ambitious treaties and political policies of Andrianampoinimerina (circa 1785–1810) and his son Radama I (1792–1828). The colonial British empire recognized the sovereignty of the Merina kingdom and its control of the Madagascar island in 1817. Radama I welcomed European traders and allowed Christian missionaries to establish missions on Madagascar. After him, the Merina people were ruled by Queen Ranavalona I ruled from 1828 to 1861, Queen Rasoherina from 1863 to 1868, and Queen Ranavalona II ruled from 1868 to 1885.

The Swahili Arab traders expanded their opportunities to trade and European colonial powers such as the French trader Joseph-François Lambert signed a disputed lease with King Radama II for plantation lands for sugarcane cultivation and industries along the Madagascar coastal plains. The Merina people called the Malagasy living along the coasts as Cotier. These operations and plantations were worked by the forced labor of imported slaves. The largest influx of slaves was brought in by the 'Umani Arabs and the French. The Makua people from Mozambique were one of the major victims of this demand, slave capture and export that attempted to satisfy this demand. The slavery was abolished by the French administration in 1896, which adversely impacted the fortunes of Merina and non-Merina operated slave-run plantations.

The dominance of the Merina kingdom over all of Madagascar came to an end with the first Franco-Hova War of 1883 to 1885, triggered by the disputed lease signed by Radama II. At the war's end, Madagascar ceded Antsiranana (Diégo Suarez) on the northern coast to France and paid 560,000 gold francs to the heirs of Joseph-François Lambert, a Frenchman who had been promised lucrative trade privileges under King Radama II that had later been revoked. The French declared Madagascar as a protectorate in 1894, which the then Merina Queen refused to sign to. The Second Franco-Hova War followed in 1895, when the French military landed in Mahajanga (Majunga) and marched by way of the Betsiboka River to the capital, Antananarivo, taking the city's defenders by surprise. In 1896, the French annexed Madagascar, and in 1897 the Merina people became the residents of the colony of French Madagascar.

In early 20th century, the Merina people led an anti-French nationalist movement. The group, based in Antananarivo, was led by a Malagasy Protestant clergyman, Pastor Ravelojoana. A secret society dedicated to affirming Malagasy cultural identity was formed in 1913, calling itself Iron and Stone Network (in local language, Vy Vato Sakelika – VVS). Repressed at first with numerous arrests over 1915 and 1916, the movement re-emerged in the 1920s through communists who gained concessions by partnering with the French Left in France.

A famine in 1943-44 led to an open rebellion in Madagascar. The 1946 constitution of the French Fourth Republic made Madagascar a territoire d'outre-mer (overseas territory) within the French Union. Madagascar gained full independence in 1958 as the Malagasy Republic. The Merina people faced competition from other ethnic groups. The first president of the Republic, Philibert Tsiranana, was a coastal Malagasy of Tsimihety ethnicity, and he was able to consolidate his power with a winner-takes-all system, while the Merina nationalists of the Congress Party for the Independence of Madagascar was weakened by rifts between leftist and ultranationalist factions. The Merina form much of the elite and educated middle-class of Madagascar. They are influential in the economy, universities and government organizations of Madagascar.

Language

The Merina dialect of the Malagasy language, also called as Hova or Malagasy Plateau or just Malagasy, is spoken natively by about a quarter of the population of Madagascar; it is classified as Plateau Malagasy alongside the Betsileo, Bezanozano, Sihanaka, Tanala, Vakinankaritra dialects. The Hova is one of two official languages alongside French in the 2010 constitution putting in place the Fourth Republic. Previously, under the 2007 constitution, Malagasy was one of three official languages alongside French and English.

Merina is the national language of Madagascar. An estimated 7.5 million people were fluent in this language in 2011, according to Ethnologue. It is written in Latin script, introduced by the Christian missionaries. Merina is the language of instruction in all public schools through grade five for all subjects, and remains the language of instruction through high school for the subjects of history and Malagasy language.

Religion
King Radama I welcomed Christian missionaries to establish missions on Madagascar in the 1810s. The Merina nobles were among the first to convert to Christianity. The London Missionary Society established numerous missions along the coast of Madagascar in the 1820s. Those who converted were offered scholarships in London and apprenticeship in Manchester.

Due to the influence of British missionaries, the Merina upper classes converted to Protestantism entirely in the mid-19th century, following the example of their queen, Ranavalona II. The early spread of Protestantism among the Merina elite resulted in a degree of class and ethnic differentiation among practitioners of Christianity. The French preferred Catholic interpreters and the former slaves of the Merina people converted to Catholicism. The ruling and noble class, however was Protestant. The nobility attempted to intervene, by expelling certain Christian missions. This dynamic ultimately created religious sect divisions in contemporary demographics.

Society and culture

Social stratification

Among all the Malagasy ethnicities, the Merina historically have had a highly stratified caste system. The overall society, like many ethnic groups in Africa, had two categories of people, the free locally called the fotsy who had ancestors with Asian Malagasy physiognomy, and the serfs or mainty who had ancestors with African physiognomy mostly captured in other parts of Madagascar. However, the fotsy-mainty dichotomy among Merina is not based on physiognomy, states Karen Middleton, but whether they have a family tomb: fotsy have family tomb, mainty are those without one or those who have established a recent tomb. The Merine people were divided into three strata: the Andriana (nobles), the Hova (freemen), and the lowest strata called Andevo (slaves).

Each strata had been then hierarchically subdivided. The Andriana are divided into six sub-strata, each had an inherited occupation, and were endogamous.

The nineteenth century records show that Andevo or slaves were imported blacks, and they constituted about a third of the Merina society. The Merina society sold highland slaves to both Muslim and European slave traders on Madagascar coast, as well as bought East African and southeast African slaves from them for their own plantations between 1795 and 1895. Marriage and any sexual relations between the fotsy and mainty were a taboo. According to a 2012 report by Gulnara Shahinian – the United Nation's Special Rapporteur on contemporary forms of slavery, the descendants of former slave castes continue to suffer in contemporary Madagascar Merina society, and inter-caste marriages socially ostracized.

Ritual and folklore
The Vazimba feature prominently in Merina oral history and popular imagination. It has been speculated that the Vazimba were the original population of Madagascar, descended from Southeast Asian seafarers who may have had pygmy physical characteristics. Among some Malagasy, the Vazimba are not believed to be human at all, but rather a form of supernatural creature possessing magical powers (mahery).

In the first seven years of their lives, boys are typically circumcised in a ritual wherein relatives request the blessings and protection of the ancestors. The Merina people also ritually kill their cattle with unusual violence, cook and consume beef prepared thereafter ceremoniously.

The Merina believe their land to be tanin'drazana (the land of the ancestors) and show reverence to their ancestors by burying them in family tombs typically located in the ancestral village of origin. Many believe that ancestors can intervene in events on Earth, for good or for ill, and this belief shapes the actions and thoughts of many Malagasy.

Cuisine

The cuisine of the Merina is so heavily dominated by rice that the term for eating a meal is simply "to eat rice". This staple of the diet is so central to the Merina that it is considered to be masina, or holy, and a common Merina belief holds that the eating of rice is the key to moral behaviour, and the French who occupied Merina lands were often looked down upon for eating bread over rice. Beef also plays a large part in the Merina diet, and according to Merina oral history, it was a servant of King Ralambo who discovered that cows were edible and shared this knowledge with the king, who in turn informed the rest of his kingdom.

Livelihoods
Rice, cassave and potatoes are staple crops of the Merina people. They also grow onions and other supplements, while cattle, pigs and animal husbandry is also a significant occupation. Many Merina people have moved into urban areas, where they operate factories and run businesses.

See also
 Malagasy people
 Merina Kingdom

Notes

Bibliography

External links
 The Merina nation

 
Ethnic groups in Madagascar